Euzophera mienshani is a species of snout moth in the genus Euzophera. It was described by Aristide Caradja in 1939 and is known from China.

References

Moths described in 1939
Phycitini
Moths of Asia
Taxa named by Aristide Caradja